The Daily Post was a newspaper published in Hobart, Tasmania from 27 May 1908 to 29 June 1918. It was established by Alfred John Nettlefold and in 1910 The Clipper was merged with it. In 1918, it became The World. Issues have been digitised and are available on Trove.

References

1908 establishments in Australia
1918 disestablishments in Australia
Defunct newspapers published in Tasmania
Newspapers on Trove
Publications disestablished in 1918
Publications established in 1908
Newspapers in Hobart, Tasmania